Mt. Pritchard Oval is a park in Mount Pritchard, New South Wales. It has a capacity of around 5,000 and is home to the Mount Pritchard Mounties. The oval is only used in rugby league matches for the NSW Cup.

Rugby league stadiums in Australia
Sports venues in Sydney